Group A of the 1996 Fed Cup Americas Zone Group II was one of two pools in the Americas Zone Group II of the 1996 Fed Cup. Six teams competed in a round robin competition, with the teams coming first advancing to Group I in 1997.

Ecuador vs. Barbados

Bolivia vs. Guatemala

El Salvador vs. Bahamas

Ecuador vs. El Salvador

Bolivia vs. Bahamas

Guatemala vs. Barbados

El Salvador vs. Guatemala

Ecuador vs. Bolivia

El Salvador vs. Barbados

Guatemala vs. Bahamas

Ecuador vs. Guatemala

Bolivia vs. El Salvador

Bahamas vs. Barbados

Ecuador vs. Bahamas

Bolivia vs. Barbados

  placed first in the pool, and thus advanced to Group I in 1997, where they placed third in their pool of four.

See also
Fed Cup structure

References

External links
 Fed Cup website

1996 Fed Cup Americas Zone